"Playgirl" is the second single from the album 604 by the electronic music group Ladytron. In 2001, the single re-release peaked at number 89 on the UK Singles Chart.

Reception
Drowned in Sound described Playgirl as a "hymn to small town claustrophobia and dissolute femininity in a style of knowing poetic allure" which "warms the cockles of the heart of the true dissenter." It ranked at number 25 on Select Magazine's Best Singles of 2000.

Track listing

Promo Maxi CD, UK (2000)
"Playgirl" (Original Version) – 3:51
"Playgirl" (Zombie Nation Remix) – 5:46
"Playgirl" (Felix Da Housecat Thee GrooveRetro Radio Mix) – 3:51
"Playgirl" (Simian Playboy Mix) – 2:40
"Playgirl" (I Monster Northern Lights Mix) – 6:06
"Playgirl" (Tobias Neumann Mix) – 3:57
"Playgirl" (Felix Da Housecat Glitz Clubhead Mix) – 6:35
"Playgirl" (King of Woolworths Coming Down Mix) – 7:50
"Playgirl" (Howie Ross Mix) – 4:46
"Playgirl" (Tobias Neumann Club Mix) – 3:54

Promo Maxi CD, Germany (2001)
Playgirl & Remixes
"Playgirl" (Glove Radio Mix) – 3:56 	
"Playgirl" (Thee Original Grooveretro Edit) – 3:51 	
"Playgirl" (Playboy Mix) – 2:40 	
"Playgirl" (Original) – 3:51

12", Germany (2001)
Playgirl (Remixes)
"Playgirl" (Felix Da Housecat Glitz Clubhead Mix) – 6:34
"Playgirl" (Playgirl (Glove Megamix) – 8:51
"Playgirl" (Zombie Nation Mix) – 5:45

12", UK (2001)
 "Playgirl" (Zombie Nation Mix)	
 "Playgirl" (Felix Da Housecat Glitz Clubhead Mix)
 "Playgirl" (I Monster Northernn Lights Mix)

CD single, US (2001)
"Playgirl" (Tobias Neumann Mix) – 3:56
"Playgirl" (Zombie Nation Mix) – 5:45
"Playgirl" (Simian Playboy Mix) – 2:38
"Playgirl" (Felix Da Housecat Glitz Clubhead Mix) – 6:37
"Playgirl" (I Monster Mix) – 6:04
"Playgirl" (Tobias Neumann Club Mix) – 3:53

CD single, Germany (2001)
 "Playgirl" – 3:50
 "Miss Black" – 1:53
 "Playgirl" (Snap Ant Version) – 6:13

CD 1 single, UK (2001)
"Playgirl" (Original 604 Version) – 3:49
"Playgirl" (King of Woolworths Coming Down) – 7:48
"Playgirl" (I Monster Northern Lites Mix) – 6:05

CD 2 single, UK (2001)
"Playgirl" (Felix Thee Grooveretro Radio Mix) – 3:51
"Playgirl" (Zombie Nation Mix) – 5:46
"Playgirl" (Simian Playboy Mix) – 2:38

Promo CD single, Germany (2001)
 "Playgirl"

Music video
There are 3 versions of "Playgirl" music video, one of them for "Playgirl" (Glove Remix)".

References

2000 singles
Ladytron songs
2000 songs